Daveys Hut is an Australian alpine hut in the Kosciuszko National Park.

The hut was built in 1909 by grazier Tom Bolton, who moved into it with his new wife, Mary, in 1911. It is now maintained by the Kosciuszko Huts Association as a stopover for hikers, and was listed on the former Register of the National Estate.

Extensive repairs were carried out in 2012, replacing the wooden foundations with brick, repairing broken fittings and doors and relining an interior plywood wall.

See also 
 Seaman's Hut

References 

Mountain huts in Australia
Houses completed in 1909
1909 establishments in Australia
New South Wales places listed on the defunct Register of the National Estate